James W. Moore (1938–2019) was a bestselling author of over 40 books, Abingdon Press' top selling author. He was a preacher and pastor, an ordained elder in the United Methodist Church.  He served as Senior Pastor of St. Luke's United Methodist Church –Houston (over 7,500 members) from 1984 to 2006. In 2006, after 50 years of active ministry, he retired from full-time ministry in the Texas Conference of the UMC and moved to the Dallas area. At the time of his death, he was serving as Minister in Residence at Highland Park United Methodist Church.

Education 
Lambuth College (Bachelor of Arts)
Methodist Theological School in Ohio (Masters of Divinity - 1963)

Centenary College of Louisiana (Doctor of Divinity).

Ordained ministry positions
Associate Pastor of the First United Methodist Church of Jackson, Tennessee, 1965-70 
Associate Director of the Memphis Conference Council on Ministries, 1970-72.  
Co-pastor of First United Methodist Church of Shreveport,  1972-84  (shared the pulpit with Dr. D. L. Dykes Jr.) 
Senior Pastor of St. Luke's United Methodist Church in Houston, 1984-2006.

Leadership 
Member of the Board of Directors of The Methodist Hospital in the Houston Medical Center
 
Member of the Board of Trustees of Southwestern University in Georgetown, Texas 
Member of the Executive Board at Perkins School of Theology in Dallas 
Member of the Houston Committee for Private Sector Initiatives 
Member National United Methodist General Council on Ministries  
United Methodist Commission on Communications 
Leader of the Texas Conference Delegation to General Conference in 1996  
Delegate to General Conference of the United Methodist Church four times (1992, 1996, 2000, and 2004)

Awards 
J. Henry Bowden Sr. Preaching Award (recognition of outstanding preaching on moral issues) 
John and Ruth Mount Alumni Award for Parish Ministry by The Methodist Theological School in Ohio  
 
Caring Spirit Award by The Houston Medical Center's Institute of Religion 
R.E. Womack Achievement Award (Outstanding Alumnus) from Lambuth University 
Sustaining Presence Award by Interfaith CarePartners

Books 
’’Seizing the Moments’’ (Abingdon Press bestseller 1988; December Book of the Month, Guideposts)
You Can Get Bitter Or Better, (Silver Angel Award 1989);   https://web.archive.org/web/20090210034515/http://angelawards.com/
Yes Lord I Have Sinned But I Have Several Excellent Excuses
Can You Remember To Forget; Is There Life After Stress?
When All Else Fails, Read The Instructions; Healing Where It Hurts
Some Things Are Too Good Not To Be True
When Grief Breaks Your Heart
Christmas Gifts That Always Fit
The Top Ten List for Graduates
What Can We Learn From the Christ Child?
When You're a Christian, the Whole World is from Missouri
Attitude is Your Paintbrush, It Colors Every Situation
The Top Ten List for Christians
Some Folks Feel the Rain Others Just Get Wet
The Cross Walk
O Say Can You See; Advent
A Calendar of Devotions
God Was Here and I was Out to Lunch
Let’s Go Over to Bethlehem
At the End of the Day
9/11: What a Difference a Day Makes
Won’t You Let Him In
If God Has a Refrigerator, Your Picture Is on It
Noah Built His Ark in the Sunshine
The Common People Heard Him Gladly
Jesus’ Parables of Grace
If You're Going the Wrong Way... Turn Around
The Sanctuary for Lent 2005
Jesus’ Parables of Life
There's a Hole in Your Soul that Only God Can Fill
Jesus’ Parables of the Lost and Found
Rich in the Things That Count The Most
The Sanctuary for Lent 2006
The Miracle of Christmas
Jesus’ Parables about Making Choices
On the Road Again
Faith is the Answer, But What are the Questions?

References

External links 
Staff page  on Highland Park UMC website
List of James W. Moore books on the Abingdon Press website.
 Sermons by James W. Moore on the Day1 website which features “America's finest mainline Protestant preachers.” 
Comments about St. Luke's UMC and James W. Moore by Bishop Janice Riggle Huie
St. Luke's UMC - Houston website
St. Luke's UMC - Celebrating the Life of Dr. Jim Moore

Methodist writers
Lambuth University alumni
Methodist Theological School in Ohio alumni
Centenary College of Louisiana alumni
Living people
American United Methodist clergy
1938 births